Hasan bin Malek (Jawi: حسن بن مالك; born 24 April 1946) is a Malaysian politician. He was the Member of Parliament of Malaysia for the Kuala Pilah constituency in the State of Negeri Sembilan (2004-2018) and formerly the Ambassador of Malaysia to Cambodia. He was the federal Minister of Domestic Trade, Cooperatives and Consumerism. He is a member of the United Malays National Organisation (UMNO) party in Malaysia's previously governing Barisan Nasional (BN) coalition.

In the 1995 general election and 1999 general election, Hasan won the state seat of Juasseh in the Negeri Sembilan State Legislative Assembly. He remained in the State Assembly until the 2004 election, in which he was elected to the federal Parliament for the seat of Kuala Pilah. He was re-elected in 2008 and 2013. After the 2008 election he became a deputy minister, and after the 2013 election, he was appointed as the Minister of Domestic Trade Cooperative and Consumerism in the Cabinet of Prime Minister Najib Razak.

In the 2018 general election, Hasan lost to Eddin Syazlee Shith of Parti Pribumi Bersatu Malaysia (PPBM), in a three-corner fight with Rafiei Mustapha of Pan-Malaysian Islamic Party (PAS) for the Kuala Pilah parliamentary seat.

Controversy
On 29 August 2019, the High Court had allowed the government's forfeiture of RM100,000 frozen from Hasan's bank account earlier in July in connection with the 1Malaysia Development Berhad (1MDB) scandal investigation.

Election results

Honours
  :
  Member of the Order of the Defender of the Realm (AMN) (1981)
  :
  Companion Class I of the Exalted Order of Malacca (DMSM) - Datuk (2000)
  :
  Knight Commander of the Order of Loyalty to Negeri Sembilan (DSNS) - Dato' (2005)
  Knight Grand Companion of the Order of Loyalty to Negeri Sembilan (SSNS) - Dato' Seri (2015)
  :
  Knight Companion of the Order of Sultan Ahmad Shah of Pahang (DSAP) - Dato' (2011)
  Grand Knight of the Order of Sultan Ahmad Shah of Pahang (SSAP) - Dato' Sri (2013)

References

Living people
1946 births
People from Negeri Sembilan
Malaysian people of Malay descent
Malaysian Muslims
Ambassadors of Malaysia to Cambodia
United Malays National Organisation politicians
Members of the Dewan Rakyat
Government ministers of Malaysia
Members of the Negeri Sembilan State Legislative Assembly
Members of the Order of the Defender of the Realm
21st-century Malaysian politicians